The Placzek transient is a phenomenon studied in nuclear engineering. The Placzek transient occurs when a population of monoenergetic neutrons of energy E elastically scatter within a homogeneous medium. In each collision the neutrons impart a fraction of their energy to the nuclei in the medium, losing up to a maximum of

where A is the atomic number of the medium. In nuclear engineering, neutrons that have not yet undergone a collision are called the 1st generation, those that have undergone a single collision are the 2nd generation, those that have undergone two collisions are the 3rd generation, and so on. The neutrons from each generation collectively form the total neutron population within the medium.

The transient results from the fact that after the 1st generation, every neutron can have at minimum an energy of  due to elastic scattering. Those neutrons that have energy less than  can only consist of neutrons in the 2nd, 3rd, or latter generations. Thus, the discontinuity in the flux arises from the fact that at each multiple of  the neutron flux is accumulated from one fewer neutron generation to the left of the discontinuity than to the right.

The Placzek transient can be derived analytically by solving for the neutron flux using a piecewise function solution to a differential equation involving a Heaviside step function in energy intervals of width . The transient can also be observed in some special case Monte Carlo neutron transport simulation codes.

References

 

Nuclear technology